Chanco is Chilean cow's milk cheese originally from the Chanco farm in Maule Region. Now it is produced all over south-central Chile, and represents almost 50% of Chilean cheese consumption. It is a semi-hard ripened cheese with reduced lactose content and soft consistency.

See also
List of cheeses

References 
www.fao.org

Chilean cheeses
Cow's-milk cheeses